The Palace of La Paeria is the name the city hall of Lleida, Catalonia, Spain, which currently houses the city council. The see is located on Plaça de la Paeria. Lleida's mayor is called Paer en cap, a term also used for Cervera's mayor. The term paer derives from Latin paciarum, meaning "man of peace". This title was given to Lleida's mayor as a special privilege by king James I The Conqueror in 1264. 

Lleida's Paeria is an example of Catalan Gothic. The façade includes all of the usual elements found in the works of this medieval architectural school

See also
List of mayors of Lleida

External links
Paeria.cat

Paeria
City and town halls in Spain
Gothic architecture in Catalonia